CCGS Terry Fox is a Canadian Coast Guard heavy icebreaker. She was originally built by Burrard-Yarrows Corporation in Canada in 1983 as part of an Arctic drilling system developed by BeauDril, the drilling subsidiary of Gulf Canada Resources. After the offshore oil exploration in the Beaufort Sea ended in the early 1990s, she was first leased and then sold to the Canadian Coast Guard.

Terry Foxs sister ship, Kalvik, is today owned by the Russian Murmansk Shipping Company as Vladimir Ignatyuk.

Development and construction 

The intention of this development was to overcome the relatively short operating window of drillships during the ice-free season (100 to 110 days a year) and the water depth limitations of artificial dredged islands in the Canadian part of the Beaufort Sea. The drilling units, each capable of completing one exploration well per year, would be supported by four Arctic Class 4 vessels: two large icebreakers providing 24-hour ice management and standby services on the drilling site and two smaller icebreaking vessels responsible for anchor handling and supply runs between the drilling rigs and coastal bases. By 1982, both drilling units and all four icebreaking vessels were under construction in Canada and Japan for BeauDril, Gulf Canada's drilling subsidiary, and the company had committed itself to a billion-dollar exploration program between 1983 and 1988.

The icebreaker design was provided by the Montreal-based engineering company German & Milne. During the development phase, the hull form was extensively tested at the Hamburg Ship Model Basin (HSVA) ice tank with particular emphasis of preventing broken ice floes from flowing under the hull and into the propellers. The result was a production-friendly fully-developable hull form with a semi-spoon bow and large ice plough. The construction of the two icebreakers was awarded to Burrard-Yarrows Corporation in December 1979 and the work was split between the company's Victoria and Vancouver divisions. In order to expedite the delivery of the vessels, Gulf Canada had already purchased the engines, gearboxes, shaft lines and propellers before signing the C$79 million shipbuilding contract for two hulls.

The keel of newbuilding number 107 was laid at the Burrard-Yarrows Vancouver shipyard on 15 June 1982 and the vessel was launched on 23 April 1983 as Terry Fox. While the other BeauDril icebreakers and drilling units were given names drawn from the Northern Territories native languages, Terry Fox was named after Terrance Stanley "Terry" Fox (1958–1981), a Canadian athlete, humanitarian and cancer research activist known for his 1980 Marathon for Hope, an attempted cross-Canada run to raise money and awareness for cancer research, after losing his right leg to osteosarcoma. The icebreaker was completed on 16 September 1983, slightly behind the original schedule which called for delivery in April when Gulf Canada's exploratory drilling program was set to begin. Terry Foxs sister ship, Kalvik, had been delivered by Victoria shipyard in July of the same year. At the time, Beaudril's two  icebreakers were the most powerful privately owned icebreaking vessels in the world.

Design

General characteristics 

While the crew's common spaces such as mess rooms and lounges are arranged on the main deck, the accommodation is arranged in the box-shaped deckhouse. In the Canadian Coast Guard service, Terry Fox has a complement of 10 officers and 14 crew, and 10 additional berths. The towing gear consists of an 80-ton winch holding  of wire and a separate 200-ton double-drum anchor-handling winch. Unlike her sister ship, Terry Fox has not been retrofitted with a helideck. However, her cargo-handling capability has been increased with a 40-tonne cargo crane and a  cargo hold in place of the original bulk cargo tanks.

Power and propulsion 

Terry Fox has a diesel-mechanical propulsion system consisting of four main engines driving two shafts through twin input-single output gearboxes. The prime movers are eight-cylinder Stork-Werkspoor 8TM410 medium-speed diesel engines producing  at 600rpm in continuous service. Each pair of main engines is coupled to a Lohmann & Stolterfoht Navilus GVE 1500 A single-stage reduction gearbox via flexible couplings designed to automatically disengage if the propellers are blocked by ice. Unlike the other Canadian offshore icebreakers built in the 1980s, Terry Fox does not have a propeller nozzles to shroud her propellers. For onboard electricity production, the ship has two  Caterpillar 3512 series ship service diesel generators and a single  Caterpillar 3406 DITA emergency diesel generator. In addition, both reduction gearboxes are fitted with clutched power take-offs for 1,250kVa shaft alternators that supply power to the stern thruster and air bubbling system compressors.

During icebreaking operations, the ice friction is reduced by lubricating the hull-ice interface with a  low-pressure air bubbling system developed by Wärtsilä. In open water, the system can also act as a bow thruster and used for maneuvering together with the ship's single centerline rudder and a  transverse stern thruster.

Career

Terry Fox (1983–1991) 

Between 1983 and 1990, BeauDril's mobile drilling units drilled a total of nineteen exploratory wells in the Canadian part of the Beaufort Sea with the support of Terry Fox and other icebreaking vessels: nine with the Mobile Arctic Caisson Molikpaq and ten with the Conical Drilling Unit Kulluk. Twelve wells alone were drilled in the Amauligak prospect, the most significant oil and gas field discovered in the region, but the high expectations for the Beaufort Sea were not met: the area was characterized by a large number of small, widely scattered resources. Molikpaq was mothballed after completing the last well in 1990.

During the leasing period, the icebreaker was found to meet Canadian Coast Guard's needs satisfactorily, and the vessel was purchased from Gulf Canada Resources on 1 November 1993. Around the same time, the majority of BeauDril's fleet was purchased by Canadian Marine Drilling (Canmar), the drilling subsidiary of Dome Petroleum (later Amoco Canada) that had been Gulf Canada's main competitor in the Beaufort Sea for more than a decade.

CCGS Terry Fox (1991–present) 

Under the Canadian Coast Guard, CCGS Terry Fox is classified as a heavy icebreaker.  She is homeported in St. John's, Newfoundland and Labrador and operates in the Gulf of St. Lawrence during the winter ice season and in Canada's eastern Arctic during the summer shipping season, assisting in escorting the annual Arctic summer sealift to coastal communities.

In 2014, Terry Fox and Louis S. St-Laurent travelled to the Canadian Arctic to map the undersea continental shelf. In August, they became the first Canadian government ships to reach the North Pole in 20 years.

Terry Fox ran aground in April 2018 near Bide Arm but managed to return to port under her own power.

While Terry Fox was scheduled for decommissioning in 2020, the repeated delays of the proposed polar icebreaker  has postponed this. , the Canadian Coast Guard has no other newbuilding plans approved as a potential replacement for the 1983-built heavy icebreaker.

See also 
 History of the petroleum industry in Canada (frontier exploration and development)

References 

Icebreakers of the Canadian Coast Guard
Ships built in British Columbia
1983 ships
Terry Fox